Yann Godart (born 19 September 2001) is a French professional footballer who plays as a right-back for Championnat National club US Avranches.

Career statistics

References

External links

2001 births
Living people
French footballers
France youth international footballers
French expatriate footballers
Association football defenders
FC Metz players
R.F.C. Seraing (1922) players
US Avranches players
Championnat National 3 players
Challenger Pro League players
Championnat National players
French expatriate sportspeople in Belgium
Expatriate footballers in Belgium
People from Bar-le-Duc
Sportspeople from Meuse (department)
Footballers from Grand Est